Associação Desportiva de Esposende (abbreviated as AD Esposende) is a Portuguese football club based in Esposende in the district of Braga.

Background
AD Esposende currently plays in the Terceira Divisão Série A which is the fourth tier of Portuguese football. The club was founded in 1978 and they play their home matches at the Estádio Padre Sá Pereira in Esposende. The stadium is able to accommodate 5,000 spectators.

The club is affiliated to Associação de Futebol de Braga and has competed in the AF Braga Taça. The club has also entered the national cup competition known as Taça de Portugal on occasions, and reached the semifinals in 1999.

Season to season

Honours

AF Braga Taça: 1971/72

Footnotes

External links
Official website 

 
Association football clubs established in 1978
1978 establishments in Portugal
Liga Portugal 2 clubs
Football clubs in Portugal
Esposende